The following is a list of dragomans.

Đorđe Branković (count) (1645-1711), Serbian dragoman who spoke Romanian, Hungarian, German, Turkish and other languages and dialects.
Jean-Baptiste Adanson (1732-1803), Scottish-French
Janus Bey, Ottoman Empire interpreter and ambassador who was active in Europe in the 1530s.
Vincenzo Belluti (19th century), Maltese
Wojciech Bobowski (1610-1675), Polish
Stefan Bogoridi (1775/1780-1859), Bulgarian
Hammad Hassab Bureik Egyptian dragoman employed by Henry S. Harper. Survived the sinking of the Titanic. 
Ioan Teodor Callimachi, Greek-Romanian
Alexandru Callimachi, Greek-Romanian
Nicolae Caradja (18th century), Greek
Alexandru Matei Ghica (18th century), Greek
Jean Georges Caradja (19th century), Greek
Armand-Pierre Caussin de Perceval (1795-1871), French
Charles Simon Clermont-Ganneau (1846-1923), French
Rigas Feraios (*1757-1798), Greek
Tomasso Barthold,(1774-1811), Italian
Gerald Henry Fitzmaurice, (1865-1939), British
Charles Fonton (1725-1793), French
Gaspar Graziani (1575/1580-1620), Italian
Alexander Hangerli (d. 1854), Greek
Constantine Hangerli (d. 1799), Greek
Martin Hartmann (1851-1918), German
Alexander Knox Helm, (1893-1964), British
Petar Ičko (1755–1808), Ottoman Greek who was Karađorđe's personal dragoman.
Johannes Kolmodin (1884-1933), Swedish
Clément Huart, French 
Auguste de Jaba (1801-1894), Polish-Lithuanian-Russian
Hadjigeorgakis Kornesios, Greek
Nassif Mallouf (1823-1865), Lebanese
Manuc Bei (1769-1817), Armenian
Alexander II Mavrocordatos (18th century), Greek
John Mavrocordatos (18th century), Greek
Nicholas Mavrocordatos (1670-1730), Greek
Nicolae Mavrogheni (18th century), Greek
Alexander Mourousis (d.1816), Greek
Constantine Mourousis (d. 1783), Greek
Antoine de Murat (ca. 1739-1813), Armenian
Panayot Nikousia (17th century), Greek
The Pisani Family 
Georg Rosen (b. 1821), Prussian
Andrew Ryan (1876-1941), British
Beyzade Aleko Soutzos (d. 1807), Greek 
Mihai Suţu (1730-1802), Greek
The Testa Family
Johann Amadeus Francis de Paula, Baron of Thugut (1736-1818), Austrian
Ármin Vámbéry (1832-1913), Hungarian
Alexander Ypsilantis (1725-1805), Greek

Definition
A dragoman was an interpreter, translator, and official guide between Turkish, Arabic, and Persian-speaking countries and polities of the Middle East and European embassies, consulates, vice-consulates and trading posts. A dragoman had to have a knowledge of Arabic, Persian, Turkish, and European languages.

References

Lists of people by occupation
Translation-related lists